The  is a Mini-shinkansen route in Japan, operated by East Japan Railway Company (JR East). It provides service between Tokyo and  Shinjō in Yamagata Prefecture over the tracks of the Tohoku Shinkansen and the Ōu Main Line.

The term Yamagata Shinkansen refers to the segment that connects Fukushima and Shinjō. Because the shinkansen trains share tracks with regular service trains, it is often referred to as a "mini-shinkansen".

Operations

Trains consist of 7-car E3 series trainsets operating as Tsubasa services. Between  and Fukushima, the trains run coupled to Yamabiko trains on the Tōhoku Shinkansen.

As of July 2012, about 62 million passengers had ridden the line since it opened in July 1992. The fastest trains connected Tokyo and Yamagata stations in two hours and 29 minutes.

Proposed Ou Base Tunnel
Construction of a Base tunnel on the Yamagata Shinkansen is proposed, with JR East having undertaken a survey of a planned route from Niwasaka to Sekine, just south of Yonezawa station.  of the proposed  line would be in tunnel, mostly to the north of the existing  Fukushima – Yamagata section. To be built on an improved alignment, the tunnel would lower journey times between Fukushima and Yamagata by ~10 min due to a proposed line speed of up to 200 km/h.

The tunnel would avoid the Itaya Toge pass through the Ou mountains west of Fukushima. Between 2011 and 2017 a total of 410 Yamagata mini-Shinkansen services were either suspended or delayed, and 40% of these incidents occurred on the line over the Itaya Toge pass.

If the  base tunnel is authorised, detailed design would take five years and construction another 15 years. The cost could increase by  if the tunnel were to be built with a cross-section large enough to permit the line to be upgraded to the full Shinkansen loading gauge.

Station list

 All stations listed below are located on the Ōu Main Line.
 Beyond Fukushima, trains bound for Tokyo run with Tohoku Shinkansen trains.

Rolling stock
As of March 2020, the following types are used on Yamagata Shinkansen services.

 E3-1000 series 7-car sets, since 4 December 1999 (to be replaced by E8 series after 2024)
 E3-2000 series 7 car sets, since 20 December 2008

Former rolling stock

 400 series 7-car sets (originally 6-car sets) withdrawn by 18 April 2010

Future rolling stock

 E8 series 7-car sets, from 2024 onwards

Non-revenue-earning-types

 East i (E269)

History
 1 July 1992: Tsubasa services start from Tokyo to Yamagata with six-car 400 Series Shinkansen attached to a 200 Series Shinkansen on Tōhoku Shinkansen tracks between Tokyo and Fukushima.
 1 December 1995: Trains are extended to seven cars.
 4 December 1999: Line is extended to Shinjō.
 21 September 2001: Double-decker E4 Series Shinkansen replace the 200 series trains on the Tōhoku Shinkansen.
 18 March 2007: All cars are made non-smoking.
 20 December 2008: E3-2000 series trains enter service
 18 April 2010: 400 series trains cease operations.
 11 March 2011: All services are suspended due to the Tōhoku earthquake and tsunami.
 31 March 2011: Partial services resume between Fukushima and Shinjō.
 12 April 2011: Through-service resumed between Tokyo and Shinjō but at half of previous capacity.
13 February 2021: Services suspended north of Nasushiobara Station due to the 2021 Fukushima earthquake.
9 June 2022: The line celebrates 30 years of operation. An E3 series trainset will be wrapped in a commemorative livery and will stay in service until November 2022.

References

External links 

 Stations of Yamagata Shinkansen (JR East) 

 
Lines of East Japan Railway Company
High-speed railway lines in Japan
Standard gauge railways in Japan
Railway lines opened in 1992
1992 establishments in Japan